Yodkhunpon Sittraipum is a Thai Muay Thai fighter who is a former Rajadamnern and Lumpinee Stadium champion. He is considered one of the best "Muay Sok" (elbow fighter) in Muay Thai history.

Biography and career
Yodkhunpon started training and fighting Muay Thai at the age of twelve at Sitraipum camp which was just a field with rudimental equipment, no ring in the Roi Et Province. He received his ring name under the teaching Thongpon Kwamsawat. Yodkhunpon followed his team when it moved to establish an actual gym called Lukjaopomehsak. There he trained alongside Samson Isaan before going to Bangkok to fight. Yodkhunpon received his nickname during the period when he fought at Samrong Stadium, one of the officials, Anucha Watcharatangka, called him the "Elbow Hunter of 100 Stitches" as his opponents would always end the fights with cuts, win or loss.

After his fighting career, Yodkhunpon went to live in Pattaya and became a trainer for various camps including Petchrungruang.

Titles & honours
 1991 Isuzu Cup Runner-up
 1992 Lumpinee Stadium (118 lbs) champion
 1992 Rajadamnern Stadium (118 lbs) champion (one defense)

Fight record

|- style="background:#fbb;"
| 1995- || Loss ||align=left| Michael Thammakasem || Rajadamnern Stadium ||  Bangkok, Thailand  || Decision || 5 || 3:00
|- style="background:#cfc;"
| 1993-12-13 ||Win||align=left| Kasemlek Kiatsiri || Rajadamnern Stadium ||  Bangkok, Thailand  || Decision || 5 || 3:00
|- style="background:#fbb;"
| 1993-09-16 || Loss ||align=left| Jaroensak Kiatnakhonchon || Rajadamnern Stadium ||  Bangkok, Thailand  || TKO (Injury)|| 3 || 
|-
! style=background:white colspan=9 |
|- style="background:#fbb;"
| 1993-07-13 ||Loss ||align=left| Kengkat Kiatkamthorn || Lumpinee Stadium ||  Bangkok, Thailand  || Decision || 5 || 3:00
|- style="background:#cfc;"
| 1993-05-26 ||Win||align=left| Namtaothong Sor Sirikul  || Rajadamnern Stadium ||  Bangkok, Thailand  || Decision || 5 || 3:00 
|-
! style=background:white colspan=9 |
|- style="background:#fbb;"
| 1993-04-27 ||Loss ||align=left| Saenklai Sit Kru Od || Lumpinee Stadium ||  Bangkok, Thailand  || Decision || 5 || 3:00
|-
! style=background:white colspan=9 |
|-  style="background:#fbb;"
| 1993-03-12|| Loss||align=left| Anantasak Panyuthaphum ||Lumpinee Stadium || Bangkok, Thailand || KO || 2 ||
|- style="background:#fbb;"
| 1993-03-03 || Loss ||align=left| Dokmaipa Por Pongsawang || Rajadamnern Stadium ||  Bangkok, Thailand  || Decision || 5 || 3:00
|- style="background:#fbb;"
| 1992-12-25 || Loss ||align=left| Singdam Or.Ukrit || Lumpinee Stadium ||  Bangkok, Thailand  || Decision || 5 || 3:00
|- style="background:#cfc;"
| 1992-12-08 || Win ||align=left| Jaroensak Kiatnakhonchon || Lumpinee Stadium ||  Bangkok, Thailand  || Decision || 5 || 3:00
|-
! style=background:white colspan=9 |
|- style="background:#cfc;"
| 1992-09-07 ||Win||align=left| Klaisuwit Soongilaanongkhee  || Rajadamnern Stadium ||  Bangkok, Thailand  || TKO || 4 || 
|-
! style=background:white colspan=9 |
|- style="background:#fbb;"
| 1992-08-04 || Loss ||align=left| Jaroensak Giatnakhonchon || Lumpinee Stadium ||  Bangkok, Thailand  || Decision || 5 || 3:00
|- style="background:#cfc;"
| 1992-06-26 ||Win||align=left| Seesot Giatchitchanok  || Lumpinee Stadium ||  Bangkok, Thailand  || TKO || 3 ||
|- style="background:#cfc;"
| 1992-06-02 ||Win||align=left| Singnoi Por.Prasatporn || Lumpinee Stadium ||  Bangkok, Thailand  || TKO (Doctor Stoppage)|| 3 ||
|- style="background:#fbb;"
| 1992-04-29 ||Loss||align=left| Singnoi Por.Prasatporn || Rajadamnern Stadium ||  Bangkok, Thailand  || KO (High kick)|| 1 ||
|- style="background:#cfc;"
| 1992-03-31 ||Win ||align=left| Saenklai Sit Kru Od || Lumpinee Stadium ||  Bangkok, Thailand  || Decision || 5 || 3:00
|- style="background:#cfc;"
| 1992-03-06 ||Win||align=left| Changnoi Sirimongkol || Lumpinee Stadium ||  Bangkok, Thailand  || TKO || 3 ||
|- style="background:#c5d2ea;"
| 1992-02-16 ||Draw||align=left| Changnoi Sirimongkol || Lumpinee Stadium ||  Bangkok, Thailand  || Decision || 5 || 3:00
|- style="background:#cfc;"
| 1992-01-24 ||Win ||align=left| Jaroenchai Sitjomtong || Lumpinee Stadium ||  Bangkok, Thailand  || Decision || 5 || 3:00
|- style="background:#fbb;"
| 1991-12-20 || Loss ||align=left| Changnoi Sirimongkol || Lumpinee Stadium ||  Bangkok, Thailand  || Decision || 5 || 3:00
|- style="background:#fbb;"
| 1991-10-29 || Loss ||align=left| Saenklai Sit Kru Od || Lumpinee Stadium ||  Bangkok, Thailand  || Decision || 5 || 3:00
|- style="background:#cfc;"
| 1991-09-20 ||Win ||align=left| Changnoi Sirimongkol || Lumpinee Stadium ||  Bangkok, Thailand  || Decision || 5 || 3:00
|- style="background:#cfc;"
| 1991-08-23 ||Win ||align=left| Prakardseuk Keatmuengtrang || Lumpinee Stadium ||  Bangkok, Thailand  || KO || 4 ||
|- style="background:#cfc;"
| 1991-07-23 ||Win ||align=left| Wanwiset Kaennorasing || Lumpinee Stadium ||  Bangkok, Thailand  || KO || 3 ||
|- style="background:#fbb;"
| 1991-06-18 || Loss ||align=left| Changnoi Sirimongkol || Lumpinee Stadium ||  Bangkok, Thailand  || Decision || 5 || 3:00
|- style="background:#cfc;"
| 1991-05-06 ||Win ||align=left| Vicharn Sitsuchon || Rajadamnern Stadium ||  Bangkok, Thailand  || KO (Left high kick) || 3 ||
|- style="background:#cfc;"
| 1991-04-09 ||Win ||align=left| Phanomrung Sitbanchong ||  ||  Bangkok, Thailand  || Decision || 5 || 3:00
|- style="background:#fbb;"
| 1991-03-09 ||Loss||align=left| Robert Kaennorasing || Samrong Stadium - Isuzu Cup Final ||  Samut Prakan, Thailand  || Decision || 5 || 3:00
|-
! style=background:white colspan=9 |
|- style="background:#cfc;"
| 1991-01-18 ||Win||align=left| Pennoi Kiatwichan || Samrong Stadium - Isuzu Cup Semi Final||  Samut Prakan, Thailand  || Decision || 5 || 3:00

|- style="background:#cfc;"
| 1990-12-16 ||Win||align=left| Chatchainoi Chaoraioi || Samrong Stadium - Isuzu Cup||  Samut Prakan, Thailand  || Decision || 5 || 3:00

|- style="background:#cfc;"
| 1990-11-11 ||Win||align=left| Daoruang Kiatpratuang || Samrong Stadium - Isuzu Cup||  Samut Prakan, Thailand  || Decision || 5 || 3:00

|- style="background:#cfc;"
| 1990-10-07 ||Win||align=left| Kongklai Muangchaiyaphum || Samrong Stadium - Isuzu Cup ||  Samut Prakan, Thailand  || Decision || 5 || 3:00
|- style="background:#cfc;"
| 1990-09-24 ||Win||align=left| Thongsabat Piyapan || Samrong Stadium ||  Samut Prakan, Thailand  || Decision || 5 || 3:00
|- style="background:#fbb;"
| 1990-09-07 ||Loss||align=left| Prakardseuk Keatmuangtrang || Lumpinee Stadium ||  Bangkok, Thailand  || KO || 2 ||
|- style="background:#c5d2ea;"
| 1990-06-26 ||Draw||align=left| Panomrung Sitbanjong || Samrong Stadium ||  Samut Prakan, Thailand  || Decision || 5 || 3:00

|- style="background:#cfc;"
| 1990-05-27 ||Win ||align=left| Jimmy Ray Tapia ||  ||  Phoenix, USA  || TKO (Knees)|| 3 ||

|- style="background:#fbb;"
| 1990-04-29 ||Loss||align=left| Somchai Kiatanan|| Samrong Stadium ||  Bangkok, Thailand  || Decision || 5 || 3:00

|- style="background:#cfc;"
| 1990-03-02 ||Win ||align=left| Prakardseuk Keatmuengtrang || Lumpinee Stadium ||  Bangkok, Thailand  || Decision || 5 || 3:00

|- style="background:#cfc;"
| 1990-01-14 ||Win ||align=left| Kongklai Muangchaiyaphum || Samrong Stadium ||  Bangkok, Thailand  || KO || 2 ||

|- style="background:#cfc;"
| 1989-12-08 ||Win ||align=left| Kwanjai Chor.Vigo || Lumpinee Stadium ||  Bangkok, Thailand  || KO || 4 ||

|- style="background:#cfc;"
| 1989-10-30 ||Win ||align=left| Kwanjai Chor.Vigo ||  ||  Chanthaburi province, Thailand  || Decision || 5 || 3:00

|- style="background:#cfc;"
| 1989-09-24 ||Win ||align=left| Thongsabad Piyaphan ||  ||   Thailand  || Decision || 5 || 3:00

|- style="background:#cfc;"
| 1989-08-20 ||Win ||align=left| Khemphet Kiatakorn ||  ||   Thailand  || Decision || 5 || 3:00

|- style="background:#cfc;"
| 1989-07-02 ||Win ||align=left| Chakchai Naruemon ||  ||   Thailand  || Decision || 5 || 3:00

|- style="background:#cfc;"
| 1989-05-14 ||Win ||align=left| Paiboon Naruemon ||  ||   Thailand  || KO || 3 ||

|- style="background:#fbb;"
| 1989-04- ||Loss||align=left| Daorung Sitchaiporn||  ||  Khon Kaen, Thailand  || Decision || 5 || 3:00

|- style="background:#cfc;"
| 1989-03-26 ||Win ||align=left| Khunapap Sakpradu ||  ||  Khon Kaen, Thailand  || KO || 3 ||

|- style="background:#cfc;"
| 1989-03-04 ||Win ||align=left| Montien Saksongkhram ||  ||  Khon Kaen, Thailand  || Decision || 5 || 3:00

|- style="background:#cfc;"
| 1989-02- ||Win ||align=left| Rungrojnoi Kiatanan || Lumpinee Stadium ||  Bangkok, Thailand  || KO || 3 ||

|- style="background:#cfc;"
| 1989-01- ||Win ||align=left| Mai Sitlawanee ||  ||  Roi Et, Thailand  || Decision || 5 || 3:00

|- style="background:#fbb;"
|  ||Loss||align=left| Therdkiat Sitphonphitak ||  ||  Isan, Thailand  || Decision || 5 || 3:00
|-
! style=background:white colspan=9 |

|-
| colspan=9 | Legend:

References

1968 births
Living people
Yodkhunpon Sittraiphum
Yodkhunpon Sittraiphum